Fahr is a German surname. Notable people with the surname include:

Jerry Fahr (1924–2010), Major League Baseball pitcher who played for one season
Julius Fahr, Canadian businessman
Karl Theodor Fahr (1877–1945), German pathologist who was born in Pirmasens of the Rhineland-Palatinate
Otto Fahr (1892–1969), German backstroke swimmer, who competed in the 1912 Summer Olympics

See also
Fahr Monastery, Benedictine nunnery located in Würenlos in the Canton of Aargau, Switzerland
Fahr's syndrome, rare, genetically dominant, inherited neurological disorder
Deutz-Fahr, German tractor brand, today part of SAME Deutz-Fahr, traces its roots to 1894 when Deutz was founded
SAME Deutz-Fahr (SDF), an Italian-based manufacturer of tractors, combine harvesters, other agricultural machines, engines and equipment
Fehr

German-language surnames